Zoran "Riko" Nišavić (born 27 March 1991) is a Montenegrin former professional basketball player.

Professional career 
A point guard, Nišavić played for Jugotes Bijelo Polje, Zdravlje, Ironi Kiryat Ata, Radnički Beograd, Crvena zvezda, ZTE, and Albacomp. He retired as a player with Albacomp in August 2006.

References

External links
 Zoran Nisavic at eurobasket.com
 Zoran Nisavic at proballers.com

1968 births
Living people
Alba Fehérvár players
BKK Radnički players
Ironi Kiryat Ata players
KK Crvena zvezda players
KK Zdravlje players
Montenegrin expatriate basketball people in Hungary
Montenegrin expatriate basketball people in Serbia
Montenegrin men's basketball players
People from Berane
Yugoslav men's basketball players
ZTE KK players